The Koolhoven F.K.43 was a small four-seat, single-engined monoplane passenger aircraft manufactured by Koolhoven in the Netherlands. It was a direct successor of the F.K.41.

It was a quite successful design with good flying qualities. KLM purchased twelve aircraft and used it as a flying taxi and for pilot training. Two of these were built by Aviolanda.

At the outbreak of World War II, four F.K.43s were requisitioned by the Royal Netherlands Air Force. One of these escaped destruction by flying to England, where it was taken into use as a liaison aircraft by the Royal Air Force. 

After the war another eight aircraft, powered by a  Armstrong Siddeley Genet Major radial engines were manufactured by Fokker (the aircraft were called "Fokhovens"). Only one of these heavily modified aircraft has survived until today.

Specifications (F.K.43)

See also

References

1930s Dutch civil utility aircraft
F.K.43
Aircraft first flown in 1931
High-wing aircraft
Single-engined tractor aircraft